Tom Seabrook (born 15 February 1999) is an English rugby union player for Gloucester Rugby in the Premiership Rugby. His preferred position is wing.

He made his debut in Gloucester's 62-12 loss to Saracens on 5 May 2018, scoring the fastest try in Premiership Rugby, within 58 seconds. On 14 February 2019, Seabrook signed his first professional contract to stay with Gloucester, thus promoted to the senior squad from the 2019-20 season. 

He first appeared for England U18s scoring two tries in his first two England U18 games against France and Scotland in 2017. He was also named in the three match tour in South Africa. He also represented England U20s during the 2019 Six Nations Under 20s Championship and the 2019 World Rugby Under 20 Championship. 

On 29 January 2023, it was confirmed that Seabrook would join Premiership rivals Northampton Saints ahead of the 2023-23 season.

References

External links
Gloucester profile
England Rugby profile
ESPN Profile
Its Rugby Profile
Ultimate Rugby Profile

1999 births
Living people
English rugby union players
Gloucester Rugby players
Rugby union centres
Rugby union players from Chelmsford